Count Hillary Yogi, real name Harry M. Frankenberg (April 4, 1915 – February 15, 1990), was an American author and golf performer. He began his career in Chicago and later moved to Los Angeles, where he adopted the stage name Count Yogi. He was a favorite golf teacher and playing partner of Mickey Rooney, Dean Martin, Hoagy Carmichael and other Hollywood stars. Count Yogi is often referred to as the "greatest golfer you've never heard of". He was a prolific scorer, teacher and traveling promoter of golf in the 20th century, performing the "Count Yogi" golf show at thousands of venues across North America. He also wrote golf books such as 5 Simple Steps to Perfect Golf (1979).

Early life and golf career 

County Yogi was born in Montana. His family moved to Chicago when he was a young boy. He lived near a golf course, mingled with the local golfers and began caddying at an early age. Quickly becoming a skillful golfer and one of Chicago's youngest golf professionals, he won many Chicago-area golf tournaments in the 1930s and '40s. By the mid 1940s, Harry Frankenberg was one of Chicago's most successful golf businessmen, owning several indoor golf ranges and teaching thousands of golfers. The Frankenberg Golf Foundation owned and operated several indoor driving ranges, and his team of golf instructors taught thousands of Chicago area golfers indoors throughout the winter months.

Later career
In the late 1940s, Frankenberg moved with his wife and young family to California, where his wife planned to pursue acting. He quickly joined the local celebrity golf scene. By the 1950s, he was a golf teacher and playing partner of Mickey Rooney, Hoagy Carmicheal and other celebrities. Carmicheal suggested that Frankenberg was like a golf yogi, causing Frankenberg to choose his nickname. Count Yogi's golf skills were legendary. He eventually started a golf show that he would perform in conjunction with golf tournaments and other events across the country. By the 1970s, he had performed over 7,000 shows.

Death

Count Yogi continued to promote golf in and around Los Angeles until his death on February 15, 1990.

Publications

Yogi, Count (2013). Revolutionary Golf Made Easy. publisher unknown. Unpublished since 1950? ASIN B00C4ZUSGU 
Yogi, Count (2013). Golf 1-2. Publisher unknown. Currently unpublished? ASIN B00C4ZHG4C

References

External links 
 YouTube channel
 Official instruction website
 Official book website

American male golfers
American golf instructors
Golfers from Chicago
Golfers from Los Angeles
1990 deaths
1908 births